William Gill (12 April 1876 – 7 June 1930) was an Australian rules footballer who played with Geelong in the Victorian Football League (VFL).

Notes

External links 

1876 births
1930 deaths
Australian rules footballers from Victoria (Australia)
Geelong Football Club players